SR3 (short for Skhanda Republic 3) is a fourth studio album by South African rapper K.O, released on September 16, 2022 through Skhanda World and Sony Music.

Background  
Release date was announced on August 19, 2022 on Twitter by K.O captioned; "#SR3 dropping 16/09/2022". It was scheduled to be released on September 16, 2022. 

SR3 final track listing was revealed on September 9, 2022.

Critical reception 
The Plug said, "As much as he reinvents himself regularly, he never loses the essence of his artistic DNA".

Track listing

Singles 

"Sete" featuring Young Stunna and Blxckie was released on August 19, 2022 as album's lead single. It debuted number one in South Africa.

Release history

References  
 

2022 albums